'Teenage Mutant Ninja Turtles is an entertainment franchise about a group of anthropomorphic turtles who fight evil.

Teenage Mutant Ninja Turtles may also refer to:

Comics
 Teenage Mutant Ninja Turtles (Mirage Studios), original Mirage Studios comic book series
 Tales of the Teenage Mutant Ninja Turtles, Mirage Studios anthology comic book series
 Teenage Mutant Ninja Turtles Adventures, Archie Comics comic book series
 Teenage Mutant Ninja Turtles (comic strip), Creators Syndicate comic strip
 Teenage Mutant Ninja Turtles (IDW Publishing), IDW Publishing comic book series

Television
Teenage Mutant Ninja Turtles (1987 TV series), known as Teenage Mutant Hero Turtles in Europe
Teenage Mutant Ninja Turtles: Legend of the Supermutants (1996 OVA series)
Teenage Mutant Ninja Turtles (2003 TV series)
Teenage Mutant Ninja Turtles (2012 TV series)
Rise of the Teenage Mutant Ninja Turtles (2018 TV series)

Film
 Teenage Mutant Ninja Turtles in film
 Teenage Mutant Ninja Turtles (1990 film), 1990
 Teenage Mutant Ninja Turtles II: The Secret of the Ooze, 1991
 Teenage Mutant Ninja Turtles III, 1993
 TMNT (film), 2007
 Teenage Mutant Ninja Turtles (2014 film), 2014
 Teenage Mutant Ninja Turtles: Out of the Shadows, 2016
 Batman vs. Teenage Mutant Ninja Turtles, 2019
 Teenage Mutant Ninja Turtles: Mutant Mayhem, 2023

Video games

 Teenage Mutant Ninja Turtles (NES video game), a 1989 video game for the Nintendo Entertainment System
 Teenage Mutant Ninja Turtles (arcade game) (US) aka Teenage Mutant Hero Turtles (Europe), a 1989 arcade game
 Teenage Mutant Ninja Turtles (pinball), a 1991 pinball machine
 Teenage Mutant Ninja Turtles (Game Boy Advance), 2003 (GBA)
 Teenage Mutant Ninja Turtles (2003 video game), 2003 (GameCube, PC, PS2, Xbox)
 TMNT (Game Boy Advance), 2007 (GBA)
 TMNT (video game), 2007 (GameCube, NDS, PC, PS2, PSP, Wii, Xbox 360)
 Teenage Mutant Ninja Turtles (2014 video game), 2014 (Android, iOS, 3DS)

Games
  Teenage Mutant Ninja Turtles & Other Strangeness (RPG), 1985 pen and paper role playing game

Music
 Teenage Mutant Ninja Turtles: The Original Motion Picture Soundtrack, 1990
 Teenage Mutant Ninja Turtles II: The Secret of the Ooze: The Original Motion Picture Soundtrack, 1991
 Teenage Mutant Ninja Turtles III: Original Motion Picture Soundtrack, 1993
 TMNT: Teenage Mutant Ninja Turtles (soundtrack), 2007

See also
 Teenage Mutant Ninja Turtles action figures
 Teenage Mutant Ninja Turtles food tie-ins